The Medical Times and Gazette was one of the principal medical journals of 19th century Britain. 

The paper  was established in January 1852, and ceased publishing in December 1885. It incorporated the earlier Medical Times and the London Medical Gazette, and was also known as the London Medical Times and Gazette.

See also
 British Medical Journal

References 

General medical journals
Publications established in 1852
Publications disestablished in 1885